Dancing Brasil is a Brazilian reality television series based on the ABC celebrity dance competition Dancing with the Stars, produced by Endemol Shine in partnership with BBC Worldwide.

The show is hosted by Xuxa Meneghel, alongside Junno Andrade, who became co-host in season four. Sérgio Marone co-hosted the first two seasons, while Leandro Lima was co-host in the third season.

The series premiered on Monday, 3 April 2017 at 10:30 p.m. (BRT / AMT) on RecordTV.

Format 
The format of the show consists of a celebrity paired with a professional dancer. Each couple performs predetermined dances and competes against the others for judges' points. The three couples receiving the lowest total of judges' points are up to the public vote, where the couple who received the fewest votes will be eliminated each week until only the champion dance pair remains.

Controversy 
In order to produce Dancing Brasil, RecordTV bought the rights to adapt Dancing with the Stars, the American version of the British series Strictly Come Dancing, from BBC Worldwide, to be co-produced by Endemol Shine.

However, Strictly has been served as the base for Dança dos Famosos (The Famous' Dance), another Brazilian series which has been airing since 2005 on Rede Globo as a 1-hour segment on Domingão do Faustão, hosted by Fausto Silva. Globo bought the rights to adapt Strictly from Endemol Shine, known at time as Endemol Globo, a joint venture between Globo and Endemol.

The joint venture was dismantled in 2017, when Endemol Shine Group began controlled directly all the company's operations in Brazil, which allowed both the British and American adaptations to be sold separately.

Series overview

Ratings and reception

Brazilian ratings
All numbers are in points and provided by Kantar Ibope Media.

References

External links 
 Dancing Brasil on R7.com

2010s Brazilian television series
2017 Brazilian television series debuts
2019 Brazilian television series endings
Brazilian reality television series
Portuguese-language television shows
RecordTV original programming
Ballroom dance
Brazilian television series based on American television series